Julian Norman Koenig (April 22, 1921 – June 12, 2014) was an American copywriter. He was inducted into The One Club Creative Hall of Fame in 1966.

Early life and education
Koenig was born to a Jewish family in Manhattan, New York City, the son of Minna (Harlib) and Morris Koenig. He was from a family of lawyers and judges. He studied at Dartmouth College and briefly at Columbia Law School. Before finishing law school he dropped out to write a novel and later found his way into the advertising industry. Koenig served four years in the United States Army Air Forces, 1942–1946. In 1946, Julian became half owner of a semi-pro baseball team, the Yonkers Indians, with his friend, writer Eliot Asinof. The team went bankrupt during its second season under their ownership, in part because there were no women's bathrooms at the Indians' ball park. Julian Koenig's older brother was Lester Koenig, a screenwriter, film producer, and the founder of the jazz record label, Contemporary Records.

Career
Koenig originated many famous advertising campaigns. While working at the advertising firm Hirshon Garfield he designed the Timex torture test commercials which featured the tagline "Timex: It takes a licking and keeps on ticking". At the firm DDB, he and Helmut Krone created the legendary "Think Small" and "Lemon" ads for Volkswagen under the supervision of William Bernbach. The "Think Small" ad was voted the No. 1 campaign of all time in Advertising Age's 1999 “The Century of Advertising." In 1960, Frederic S. Papert, an account manager from Kenyon & Eckhardt, persuaded Koenig and George Lois to start up their own creative hot shop, PKL. In 1962, they broke an industry taboo by doing an IPO. Within years several other agencies followed their lead. Koenig was on Senator Gaylord Nelson's 1969 committee that established Earth Day on April 22. Koenig coined the name "Earth Day". Koenig later stated that he was inspired by the fact that “Earth Day” rhymes with “birthday” (April 22 was also Koenig’s birthday).

Denis Hayes, the environmental activist who coordinated the first Earth Day, recounts Koenig's involvement:

In 1970, copywriter Jerry Della Femina wrote of Koenig:

Personal life
Koenig was married twice. His first wife was Aquila Wilson Connolly. They had two children: Pauline "Pim", an artist; and John, a businessman and horse racing enthusiast. They later divorced. His second wife was Maria Eckhart with whom he had two daughters: Antonia, an attorney and social worker; and Sarah, a producer for the public radio show This American Life and host of acclaimed podcast Serial. They also divorced.

Koenig had a long running feud with one time collaborator George Lois over various works which Koenig felt Lois improperly claimed credit for.

According to Koenig's daughter Sarah, he was known for making unusual personal claims himself, such as that he had invented thumb wrestling or that he had popularized the consumption of shrimp in the United States.

Koenig died in Manhattan on June 12, 2014.

References

External links

A speech by Koenig at the Advertising Writers Club (November 9, 1961)

1921 births
American copywriters
Dartmouth College alumni
Jewish American military personnel
2014 deaths
Writers from Manhattan
United States Army Air Forces personnel of World War II
Koenig family
21st-century American Jews